Metasada is a genus of moths of the family Noctuidae erected by George Hampson in 1910.

Species
 Metasada acontianalis Rothschild, 1915
 Metasada polycesta Turner, 1902

References

Acontiinae